Aymen Hussein Ghadhban (born 21 January 1996) is an Iraqi professional footballer who plays as a striker for UAE Pro League club Al Jazira Club and the Iraqi national team.

Club career
In 2009, Aymen was spotted as a gifted teenager with his local team and it was because of a local resident who was also a board member at the Al-Alam SC who recommended the player to his club. He played for youth Al-Alam in the provincial league, and for the first team and then moved to Tuz FC, and with no club from Kirkuk in the top divisions in the Iraqi league, Aymen took the unorthodox route in his attempts into getting into a top flight of the Iraqi Premier League by signing for Gas Al-Shamal a club  which was then in the second tier of the Kurdistan League, a division formed of primarily reserve players from the top Kurdish clubs.

At the end of the season 2012–13, Aymen was offered the opportunity to play in the Iraqi Premier League for the first time when he was contacted by the assistant coach of Duhok, Khalid Mohammed Sabbar and was offered a lucrative contract to play for the club which Aymen said he agreed to immediately amid “great joy” working under the former Iraq captain and the two renowned coaches Syrian Fajr Ibrahim and Thair Ahmed during his spell with Duhok.

He appeared only a few times for Duhok scoring one goals in the first stage of the season, however with salaries going unpaid for months at the cash-strapped club feeling the full ramifications of the financial crisis which had hit the Kurdistan region, Aymen made the decision to try his luck in Baghdad. He had been one of six players at Duhok released due to their financial troubles during the latter part of the 2014.

Al Naft
Aymen transferred to Al-Naft in winter 2015. His breakthrough season came in the 2016–17 season for Al Naft where he scored 12 goals in 10 games launching Al Naft to the top of the league, before an injury prevented him sidelined all the way from February till May. Al Naft continued on their impressive set of results and ended up finishing as the league runners up, which is their best ever result.

Al Shorta
On 22 August 2017, Hussein signed for Iraqi giants Al Shorta. to replace Marwan Hussein. He made his debut on 21 November, scoring in the matchday one fixture against Karbalaa FC. He scored twice in his second game, a 4–1 win over Al-Bahri, he then scored in two more games, to extend his scoring record to four games in a row. On the fifth game, Aymen missed a last-minute penalty to end his goal-scoring streak. Aymen would then leave the Al-Shorta camp to join the Iraqi U-23 side in the 2018 AFC U-23 Championship in China. After his return he leave the Al Shorta.

Return to Al Naft
On 2 February 2018, he returned to his former club Al-Naft with his favorite coach Hassan Ahmed Aymen started his first match with Al Naft against Al-Hudood FC, he missed a penalty. and another against Naft Al-Wasat. After five games he scored goal against Al-Talaba in the 1–0 victory in April and continued to score. He finished his season with Al Naft with 11 goals in 22 matches in the league. The team finished in 3rd position. he was released from Al-Naft after the game against CS Sfaxien 1–1. because of disagreements.

CS Sfaxien
On 15 September 2018, Tunisian club Sfaxien announced on the last day of the summer transfer window the signing of Aymen.

Umm Salal
In the summer 2021, Aymen joined Umm Salal in Qatar.

International career
Aymen first represented Iraq in 2015, playing for the U23 Iraqi team. He was called up to the 2016 AFC U-23 Asian cup in Qatar. He scored the winning goal in the third-place playoff match which won Iraq the bronze medal and sent them to the 2016 Rio Olympic Games, Aymen was injured in a friendly match against Syria, preventing him from going to the Olympics. 
The following year, Aymen was present at the 2018 AFC U-23 Championship qualification, he scored 5 goals in the first match against Afghanistan. He also scored another goal against Saudi Arabia, to ensure that Iraq won all three games and qualified for the 2018 AFC U-23 Championship. Aymen scored twice in three games in the tournament, as Iraq went out in the quarter-finals.

On 26 August 2015, Aymen earned his first international cap, playing against Lebanon in a friendly match. He scored his first goal against the UAE on September 5, 2017, in a world cup qualifying match. He was called up to the 23rd Arabian Gulf Cup, where Iraq ended up reaching the semi-finals.

International goals
Scores and results list Iraq's goal tally first.

Style of play
Aymen is seen as the typical complete forward who can play up front. Not seen as the most versatile, but he is a natural goalscorer. While other strikers such as Mohanad Ali score many goals, they are a different types of striker to Aymen, who is good in and around the box in the air and on the ground. He has a powerful right foot. He is also known for his large stature, physical strength and diligence. Since 2015, he is seen as the best heir to former international striker Younis Mahmoud.

Personal life
Aymen was born 1996 in the rural village of Al-Safra in the Al-Riyadh sub-district in south-western part of Kirkuk, the village was situated in the turbulent district of Hawija, which had been controlled by ISIS and has been the scene of coalition airstrikes from 2014 to 2017. Insurgents have frequently targeted oil pipelines in the village since the fall of Saddam Hussein in 2003, with daily car bombs and improvised explosive device (IED) blasts a normal part of life for the Aymen. His father, an officer in the Iraqi Army, was murdered on duty by an Al Qaeda terrorist attack in 2008, His mother and brothers Asser and Laith were internally displaced in the city of Kirkuk. his brother was kidnapped by ISIS and his whereabouts are still unknown, and the player and his family became Internally displaced within Iraq. His mother and brothers Asser and Laith were internally displaced in the city of Kirkuk in 2014.

Honours
CS Sfaxien
 Tunisian Cup: 2018–19
Al-Quwa Al-Jawiya
 Iraqi Premier League: 2020–21
 Iraq FA Cup: 2020–21

Iraq
 Arabian Gulf Cup: 2023

Individual
Iraqi Premier League top scorer: 2020–21 (22 goals)
Arabian Gulf Cup joint top scorer: 2023 (3 goals)

References

External links
 
 
 Aymen Hussein at CS Sfaxien

1996 births
Living people
People from Kirkuk Governorate
Iraqi footballers
Iraq international footballers
Association football forwards
Duhok SC players
Al-Shorta SC players
CS Sfaxien players
Umm Salal SC players
Al-Markhiya SC players
Tunisian Ligue Professionnelle 1 players
Qatar Stars League players
Expatriate footballers in Tunisia
Expatriate footballers in Qatar
Iraqi expatriate sportspeople in Qatar
Iraqi expatriate footballers
2019 AFC Asian Cup players